Jonathan Paul Millmow (born 22 September 1967) is a former New Zealand cricketer who played five One Day Internationals.

References

1967 births
Living people
New Zealand cricketers
New Zealand One Day International cricketers
Wellington cricketers
People educated at St. Patrick's College, Wellington